Basilinna is a genus of hummingbird in the family Trochilidae.

Species
The genus contains only two species:

References